The Cradling Arm (2013) is an oil painting created by Zhang Yan. The painting vividly depicts a little girl's happiness and content in the embrace and protection of her mother, the Mother Earth and the motherland.

It is collected by the Vatican Museums permanently in May 2017.

Background 

In 1992, Zhang Yan, who loves art, went to Tibet, China. During the five years living in Tibet, he had opportunities to deeply explore the snow-covered plateau, which is considered to be “The last pure land of the world”. In Tibet, he experienced the traditional culture of Tibet, and made an unprecedented exploration on nature, humanity and religion. He overcame the harsh environment physically and psychologically, and finally combined the nature, humanity and religion together, which enabled him to create this extraordinary and shocking work “The Cradling Arm”.

Description 

Showered in the first rays of the morning sun, a Tibetan girl nestles herself in her mother's arm.

The mother's arms superimpose a landscape of the ups and downs of the Gangdisi Mountains, as the brightly colored scarf tassels superimpose the breathtaking view of the first rays of the morning sun over the summit of the Mount Kailash, resembling the sacredness, greatness and power of the Mother Earth. 
Under the reflections of the bright scarf and sheepskin coat, the little girl's innocent look with her ‘plateau red’ cheeks and adorable eyes presents to viewers the unique qualities of innocence, sanctity and confidence of the Tibetan people.

Interpretation 

The artist adopted a combination of the traditional western oil painting and traditional Chinese fine-brush landscape painting techniques in this realistic oil painting of the ‘Tibetan Plateau showered under the rising sun, as Dolma, a young Tibetan girl nestles herself in her mother’s arms’. 

The Cradling Arm is collected by the Vatican Museums permanently in May 2017, which is the first living artist's work permanently preserved by the Vatican Museum.

References

External link
, La diplomazia nell'arte from iscom.info

Oil paintings
Chinese paintings
2013 paintings